Mike & Molly is an American television sitcom created by Mark Roberts on CBS. It premiered on September 20, 2010, and aired 127 episodes over six seasons. The series stars Billy Gardell and Melissa McCarthy as the eponymous Mike and Molly, a couple who meet in a Chicago Overeaters Anonymous group and fall in love.

The 13-episode sixth season began airing on January 6, 2016. On January 12, 2016, CBS announced that Mike & Molly would end after six seasons, electing not to renew the series for a seventh season with its licensing agreement with Warner Bros. Television ending. The series concluded on May 16, 2016.

Premise
Chicago Police officer Mike Biggs and elementary school teacher Molly Flynn meet at an Overeaters Anonymous meeting, starting a casual relationship that becomes more serious throughout the first season. Mike initially lives in a one bedroom apartment and often visits his cantankerous, divorced mother, Peggy. Molly and her sister, Victoria, live in the Chicago home owned by their widowed mother, Joyce. The Flynn household soon adds Joyce's boyfriend and later husband, Vince. Mike and his best friend Carl, also an officer with the Chicago PD, frequently eat breakfast at Abe's Diner, where they befriend their Senegalese waiter, Samuel. The series follows the various stages of Mike and Molly's relationship, from couplehood to engagement to marriage, all while dealing with their challenging relatives and friends as well as Molly's career changes.

Cast

 Billy Gardell as Officer Michael "Mike" Biggs, a Chicago police officer attempting to lose weight. He doesn't appear to be a deep thinker, but he's good-hearted and humorous. He often caves in to his mother's demands, much to Molly's dismay, but his relationship with Molly has made him much more independent.
 Melissa McCarthy as Molly Flynn, a fourth-grade teacher at Walter Payton Elementary School, also attempting to lose weight. She is sweet, happy, intelligent, and caring. She is the rational member of her family, but is known to have a quick temper and has built up much debt from lavish shopping and traveling. When she and Mike finally marry, she keeps Flynn as her last name, and they spend much of their time trying to get pregnant. She quits her teaching job in Season 4 to become a writer.
 Reno Wilson as Officer Carlton "Carl" McMillan, a Chicago police officer and Mike's partner and best friend. He tends towards self-pity, owing to his mother abandoning him. He lived with his grandmother for a long time until she made him move into his own apartment. He struggles in relationships with women and is depicted as lonely. He is a big fan of soul and gospel music and openly dislikes bluegrass. In Season 2 he had a steady relationship with Christina (Holly Robinson Peete), a single mother with a young son, but in Season 3 Christina broke up with Carl to try to work things out with James, her famous football player ex-husband and her son's father. He began a relationship with Victoria at the end of Season 4, but by the end of Season 5, it was over until they got back together in the series finale.
 Katy Mixon as Victoria Flynn, Molly's dimwitted, kindhearted, party-girl sister who is often high on marijuana and sleeping around with multiple men. She is employed as a funeral home beautician. At the end of Season 4 she began a relationship with Carl which ended badly in Season 5 but they got back together in the series finale.
 Swoosie Kurtz as Joyce Flynn-Moranto, mother of Molly and Victoria. Widowed when her daughters were young, she began dating Vincent Moranto in Season 1. She is very modern and attempts to stay youthful; she also drinks heavily and has a hair-trigger temper. As of the Season 3 episode "Thanksgiving Is Cancelled", she is married to Vincent.
 Nyambi Nyambi as Babatunde, aka Samuel, a sarcastic waiter at Abe's, the restaurant where Mike and Carl eat. He is also a close friend to Mike, Carl, and eventually Molly. He is from Senegal and often refers to the suffering in his home country, so he cannot easily sympathize with his restaurant patrons' "petty" problems. He and Carl became roommates in Season 3. In Season 5, Samuel's real name is revealed to be Babatunde when he becomes the new owner of Abe's Diner, since renamed Abe's Hot Beef.
 Louis Mustillo as Vincent "Vince" Moranto, Joyce's on/off boyfriend, then fiancé, and later her husband which makes him Molly and Victoria's stepfather. A widower, he tends to be flirty, chauvinistic, and sarcastic. A high-school dropout, he's not the most intelligent, but he cares deeply for Joyce and has shown fatherly care toward Molly and Victoria—despite having met Molly after being set up on a blind date with her, and his constant comments about Victoria's breasts. He once married a much older, very unpleasant woman from whom he fled after borrowing $2,000; he didn't officially end this marriage until the truth came out and Joyce kicked him out of her house until Mike convinced the "wife" to sign divorce papers.
 Rondi Reed as Margaret "Peggy" Biggs, Mike's mother. She is very controlling and traditional, as well as grumpy and cranky. She often refers to her ex-husband Jack leaving her and running away to Florida with a prostitute. Peggy is also very fussy over her dog Jim (a Brussels Griffon mix), whom she treats more like a son than a pet. In Season 2, Peggy began working as a lunch lady at the elementary school where Molly teaches. In Season 3, she dates a police captain who is Mike's supervisor, but Peggy breaks things off during the season finale.
 Cleo King as Rosetta McMillan (regular, seasons 1–3; recurring, seasons 4–5; guest, season 6), Carl's grandmother. She is very traditional and has professed deep love for her grandson, but is outwardly annoyed by Carl's behavior and made him move out in Season 3, saying she still loves him and looks forward to him visiting but wants him to finally become a responsible adult on his own. She has a big heart and treats Mike, who calls her "Nana", like a second grandson. She often gives Mike and Carl advice (mostly regarding relationships with women).
 David Anthony Higgins as Harry (regular, seasons 3–6; recurring, season 2; guest, season 1), a friend of Mike and Molly's who attends the same Overeaters Anonymous meetings. He is nice, but socially awkward and tends to say whatever he is thinking, even thoughts that make him seem pathetic. He was shown to have an almost obsessive crush on Victoria; when she finally kissed him in season 3, he realized that he is gay.
 Suzie Q as Jim, Peggy's dog, it is a Griffon Bruxellois mixed with a Chihuahua.

Episodes

Production
In December 2009, CBS placed a pilot order for Mike & Molly. Mark Roberts wrote the pilot, which was directed by James Burrows, with both Roberts and Burrows serving as executive producers alongside Chuck Lorre, Don Foster and the production companies Chuck Lorre Productions and Warner Bros. Television.

On May 13, 2010, CBS placed a series order on Mike and Molly. (The set from "Roseanne" was used as Molly's home. Doors and furnishings were changed. It was usually shot from different angles so the "Roseanne" audience wouldn't notice.) On May 15, 2011, Mike and Molly was renewed for a second season. On March 14, 2012, CBS renewed Mike & Molly for a third season, which premiered on September 24, 2012. CBS pulled the third season finale, titled "Windy City", from its show of May 20, 2013. The episode featured a tornado descending on Chicago, and would have been broadcast the same day as the 2013 Moore tornado. The episode was rescheduled for May 30, 2013.

On March 27, 2013, CBS announced that Mike & Molly would return for a fourth season during the 2013–2014 television season. On May 17, 2013, Mark Roberts stepped down from showrunner duties to focus on other projects. Al Higgins replaced him for Season 4. The series received a 22-episode order from CBS for its 4th season. The show's fourth season premiere took place on November 4, 2013 at 9:00 pm ET/8:00 pm CT, in the time slot vacated by 2 Broke Girls when it moved to 8:30 pm ET/7:30 pm CT, replacing the canceled sitcom, We Are Men. Following the breakout feature film success of McCarthy (Identity Thief, The Heat), Lorre intended for the show to more prominently feature her in season 4. In promos leading up to the season 4 premiere, CBS billed the series as "the new Mike & Molly." Though the cast and setting remains essentially the same, the "new" refers to Molly quitting her teaching job and pursuing a career as a writer.

On March 13, 2014, CBS announced the fifth season renewal of Mike & Molly. CBS did not place the show in a timeslot when it unveiled its initial 2014-15 schedule. The fifth season began airing December 8, 2014.

On March 12, 2015, CBS announced the sixth season renewal of Mike & Molly.

On January 12, 2016, it was announced that the series would end after six seasons. The final episode aired on May 16, 2016. CBS announced during its Upfront presentation that Mike & Molly would be replaced by Kevin Can Wait and Man with a Plan.

Casting
Casting announcements began in February 2010, with Katy Mixon and Reno Wilson being the first actors cast in the series. Mixon portrays the role of Victoria, Molly's sister, while Wilson portrays Carl, Mike's partner. Billy Gardell was the next actor cast in the series, as the titular Mike. Swoosie Kurtz then joined the series as Molly's mother, Joyce. Following Kurtz, Nyambi Nyambi boarded the series as Samuel, a regular waiter at Abe's Hot Beef, where Mike and Carl frequent. Melissa McCarthy completed the cast when she signed on to play the role of Molly.

Reception

Ratings

Critical reception
Mike & Molly has received moderately positive reviews from critics. On Rotten Tomatoes, the show holds a rating of 69% with an average rating of 5.46/10, based on 29 reviews. The consensus reads: "Mike & Molly is a conventional sitcom that's able to mine some big laughs, thanks to the immensely appealing central performers". On Metacritic it has a score of 62 out of 100 based on 23 reviews, indicating "generally favorable reviews". Critic Randee Dawn gave the show a negative review, stating the cast is likable, but the jokes are old and bland.

Controversies
Controversy arose in 2010 around a Marie Claire blog post written by Maura Kelly, in which she refers to the actors on the show as "fat bastards." Show creator Mark Roberts spoke out regarding Kelly's blog post, calling the comments "very high school". He also stated, "This wasn't about the show, this wasn't about the writing, this wasn't about the acting. This was about someone's hateful response to how these two human beings look." Billy Gardell also addressed the matter when he appeared on the daily talk show The Talk on November 1, 2010. Marie Claire has stood behind the blog. Kelly has since given a non-apology apology for her comments, stating that she "sorely regret[s] that it upset people so much".

In the season 3 episode "Molly's New Shoes", the character Peggy reacts to her fiancé's plans to retire and move to Arizona with the line "Arizona? Why should I go to Arizona? It's nothing but a furnace full of drunk Indians." This prompted calls by the Native American Journalists Association, among others, for an apology.

Accolades

Broadcast
The series airs in Canada on CTV, CTV Two, City, and M3 from September 20, 2010. In the United Kingdom it aired on Comedy Central UK from October 4, 2010 and reran on Channel 4 from September 10, 2018. In Ireland
| Comedy Central UK began showing it also on October 4, 2010. February 9, 2011 was the premiere for Nine Network in Australia. New Zealand's TV2 started it from April 29, 2011. In South Africa M-Net started it from April 8, 2011.

Syndication
The off-network rights to Mike & Molly were sold to FX in 2012 and premiered on the network in September 2014. On September 23, 2021, the series was removed from FX streaming app. In 2021, the syndication rights to Mike and Molly were sold to Nick at Nite. The block premiered the series on October 5, 2021. It also premiered on sister channels TV Land on October 15, 2021 and CMT that same month.

The series began airing in off-network syndication on NBC, CBS, ABC, Fox, The CW, MyNetworkTV, and independent stations across the country in the fall of 2014.

Home media
In the United States, the first season of Mike and Molly was released on both DVD and Blu-ray. All subsequent seasons have only received a DVD release. On October 11, 2016, the sixth and final season was released, as well as a complete series collection. In Australia, the first four seasons have been released on DVD, and in the United Kingdom, only seasons one and two have been released.

See also 
 Bob Hearts Abishola

References

External links
 
 
 Vanity cards archive for Mike & Molly

2010s American police comedy television series
2010s American romantic comedy television series
2010s American sitcoms
2010 American television series debuts
2016 American television series endings
CBS original programming
English-language television shows
Fictional married couples
Fictional portrayals of the Chicago Police Department
 
Obesity in television
Primetime Emmy Award-winning television series
Television duos
Television series about couples
Television series about marriage
Television series by Warner Bros. Television Studios
Television shows set in Chicago
Television shows filmed in Los Angeles